Cliff or Clifford Johnson may refer to:

Cliff Johnson (baseball) (born 1947), former Major League Baseball designated hitter
Cliff Johnson (footballer) (1914–1989), English footballer
Cliff Johnson (game designer) (born 1953), computer puzzle games creator
Cliff Johnson (rugby league), New Zealand rugby league footballer
Clifford V. Johnson, English theoretical physicist
Clifford D. Johnson, American lawyer